Tess of the Storm Country may refer to:
 Tess of the Storm Country (novel), 1909 American romance by Grace Miller White#Biography
 Tess of the Storm Country (1914 film), starring Mary Pickford and directed by Edwin S. Porter
 Tess of the Storm Country (1922 film), starring Mary Pickford and directed by John S. Robertson
 Tess of the Storm Country (1932 film), starring Janet Gaynor and directed by Alfred Santell
 Tess of the Storm Country (1960 film), starring Diane Baker and directed by Paul Guilfoyle